The Victory Tour was a concert tour of the United States and Canada by the Jacksons from July to December 1984. It was the only tour with all six Jackson brothers, even though Jackie was injured for some of it. The group performed 55 concerts to an audience of approximately 2 million. In the 22 locations performed, 19 of the locations were performed in large stadiums. Many came to see Michael, whose album Thriller was dominating the popular music world at the time. Many consider it to be his Thriller tour, with most of the songs on the set list coming from his Thriller and Off the Wall albums. The tour reportedly grossed approximately $75 million ($ million in  dollars) and set a new record for the highest-grossing tour. It showcased Michael's single decorated glove, black sequined jacket and moonwalk. The tour was choreographed by Paula Abdul, and promoted by Don King. Despite the billing of being a 'world tour', the shows were staged to the United States and Canada alone.

Despite its focus on Michael, it was named after the Jacksons' album Victory. The album was released four days before the tour's first show in Kansas City, Missouri and turned out to be a commercial success. However, none of the album's songs were performed on the tour. Jermaine had a successful new album out as well (Jermaine Jackson, also known as Dynamite, which had been released in April 1984) and some material from that album was performed. Also, all three of the Jacksons' sisters released new albums that year, but Rebbie, La Toya, and Janet were not part of the tour (aside from a cameo appearance for a few moments at the end of the final show with other family members).

According to Marlon, Michael refused to rehearse or perform any of the songs from Victory. Marlon also stated that Michael had only reluctantly joined his brothers, who needed the income while he himself did not. On the tour, tensions between Michael and his brothers increased so much that at the December 9 concert he announced that it would be the last time they would perform together, ending plans for a European and Australian leg of the tour in the spring and summer of 1985.

The Jacksons and promoter Don King did make money from the tour. Michael donated his share to several charities as he had promised before it, but the rancor between him and his brothers had a deep and lasting effect on the Jacksons as a family, alienating him from them for most of his later life, and effectively ended the Jacksons as a performing group. The Jacksons made one more album in 1989, but aside from the concert celebrating Michael's thirty years as a solo artist in 2001, they never toured again during Michael's lifetime.

The tour was also a financial disaster for promoter Chuck Sullivan, who along with his father Billy was eventually forced to sell the New England Patriots football team they owned, along with Foxboro Stadium, the team's home field, as a result of the losses he incurred.

Background

In November 1983, the Jacksons announced plans for a major tour in 1984 at a press conference, with boxing promoter Don King offering $3 million ($ million in  dollars) in upfront advances. That spring, the Victory album was recorded, to be released shortly before the tour itself.

At the time the tour was announced, the Jacksons had not lined up a promoter for the shows. In the spring of 1984, Chuck Sullivan, son of Billy Sullivan, owner of the New England Patriots of the National Football League (NFL), went to Los Angeles to see if he could get the Jacksons to choose the team's home, Sullivan Stadium, which the family also owned, for the group's Boston-area shows. After using his financial and legal expertise to help his father regain control of the team he had founded and built in the wake of a 1974 boardroom coup, the younger Sullivan, who had promoted concerts as an undergraduate at Boston College and during his United States Army service in Thailand, had begun staging concerts at the stadium to generate extra income for the team.

The set list included songs from the Jacksons' albums Destiny and Triumph. Despite the name of the tour, the Victory album was not represented. There were also songs on the list from Jermaine's and Michael's solo careers. Songs from Michael's albums Off the Wall and Thriller were both represented. The set list did not include "Thriller" itself because Michael did not like the way the song sounded live, but it was later performed regularly during Michael's solo tours. "State Of Shock" was also rehearsed during sound check but was never performed (although a snippet of Michael’s vocal was heard in leaked footage of the concert in Toronto).  Jermaine sometimes performed the song "Dynamite" during his solo segment in place of the usual "You Like Me, Don't You?"

Planning and organization
At a meeting, Frank DiLeo, a vice president at Epic Records, the Jacksons' label, told Sullivan that the group's talks with its original promoter had broken down and they were seeking a replacement. Sensing an opportunity, Sullivan returned to Boston and began putting together the financing to allow Stadium Management Corp. (SMC), the Patriots' subsidiary that operated the stadium, to promote the entire Victory Tour. Initially he partnered with Eddie DeBartolo, then owner of another NFL team, the San Francisco 49ers, in putting together a bid offering the Jacksons two-thirds of the tour's gross revenue against a guaranteed $40 million ($ million in modern dollars).

DeBartolo withdrew when he began to see the deal as too risky, but Sullivan persevered by himself, and in late April DiLeo told him at another meeting in Los Angeles that SMC, which had never handled a tour, would be the promoter of the year's most eagerly anticipated concert tour, expected to gross $70–80 million. The deal was very generous to the Jacksons. Sullivan had agreed that they would receive 83.4% of gross potential ticket revenues, which meant in practical terms that the group would be paid as if the show had sold out regardless of whether it actually did. That percentage was at least 25 points above what was at that time the industry standard for artists on tour.

Sullivan also guaranteed the Jacksons an advance of $36.6 million ($ million in modern dollars). He put the Sullivan Stadium up as collateral for a $12.5 million loan to pay the first installment shortly before the tour started. The balance was due two weeks later.

The month after winning the tour bid, Sullivan approached stadium managers at the NFL's meetings, many of whom were there to bid for future Super Bowls. He sought changes to their usual arrangements with touring performers in order to make the Victory Tour more profitable. Kansas City's Arrowhead Stadium, home of the Chiefs, agreed to accept only a $100,000 fee for the three opening concerts instead of its usual percentage of ticket sales and concessions. The Gator Bowl in Jacksonville, Florida, provided nearly half a million dollars' worth of free goods and services. Ultimately, 26 of the 55 dates were played in 17 stadiums that were home to NFL teams. But some others balked at Sullivan's demands. To use John F. Kennedy Stadium, Sullivan asked the city of Philadelphia for almost $400,000 in tax breaks and subsidies. Among them were free hotel rooms and suites for all tour workers, free use of the stadium and waiver of concession revenue. He said the Jacksons' presence would generate revenue that would make up the difference, but the city stood firm on some provisions.

Outside of negotiations, Sullivan's behavior on tour embarrassed the Jacksons on some occasions. At Washington's Robert F. Kennedy Stadium, he forgot his pass and was denied entry. Sullivan was particularly humiliated when the board of selectmen in Foxboro, where his family's team and stadium were located, uncharacteristically denied a permit for the concert, citing "the unknown element". This was not only a major personal embarrassment for Sullivan, but also a crippling financial blow as it denied the family the use of the only facility where they would have kept all of the revenue from sources such as concessions and parking.

In retrospect, it was suggested by news writers that the board's decision was racially motivated. It was also stated that there had been continuing security concerns about the stadium during Patriots' games and previous concerts, but the board had never denied permits on that basis before. Others pointed the possibility of lobbying from the Sullivans' business rivals, since the family had accumulated many enemies in the state of Massachusetts over years of often bitter struggle to keep control of their football team. In any case, Sullivan was acutely aware that staging any sort of large event in Massachusetts at the time was considered a privilege utterly dependent on the goodwill of the board of selectmen, and thus was in no position to antagonize them further by challenging their decision.

To help defray the tour's costs, the Jacksons sought a corporate sponsor. They had all but concluded a lucrative deal with Quaker Oats when King came to them with a deal he had already signed with Pepsi. Although it would pay them less money, the brothers were acutely aware that King was able and willing to shut down the entire tour if he were crossed. They thus had no choice except to take the deal with Pepsi and break off talks with Quaker.

Part of the deal arranged by King was that Michael, who did not drink Pepsi, would have to do two commercials. He made sure that his face appeared minimally in them to avoid overexposing his image, much to King's annoyance. During filming of one of the two commercials, Michael suffered second and third degree burns on his scalp when a pyrotechnic effect malfunctioned, catching his hair on fire. Many people, including friends and associates of Michael, believe this incident is what sparked his problems with prescription drug abuse.

Ticket controversy and other business issues
King, Sullivan and the Jacksons' father Joe Jackson (who no longer managed any of his sons by that point) came up with a way to generate additional revenue from ticket sales. Those wishing to attend would have to send a postal money order for $120 ($ in  dollars) along with a special form to a lottery to buy blocks of four tickets at $30 apiece (US$ in  dollars), ostensibly to curtail scalpers. Upon receipt the money was to be deposited into a standard money market account earning 7% annual interest; it would take six to eight weeks for the lottery to be held and money to be refunded to the unsuccessful purchasers. Since only one in ten purchasers would win the lottery and receive tickets, there would be more money in the bank for that time period than there were tickets to sell, and they expected to earn $10–12 million in interest.

Joe, Jackie, Tito, Jermaine, Marlon, and Randy were in favor of the plan, but Michael was not and he warned them that it would be a public relations disaster. The $30 ticket price was already higher than most touring acts (such as Prince and Bruce Springsteen) charged at the time, and was compounded by the requirement to buy four. This put tickets out of reach of many of Michael's African-American fans who were not financially secure. That community was joined by many commentators in the media in vociferously criticizing the Jacksons over the plan. Nevertheless, when newspapers published the form for tickets to the first show in Kansas City in late June, fans lined up at stores before they opened to buy them. A local radio disk jockey said some newspapers were even stolen from lawns.

On July 5, 1984, after receiving a letter from eleven-year-old fan Ladonna Jones, who accused the Jacksons and their promoters of being "selfish and just out for money," Michael held a press conference to announce changes in the tour's organization and also to announce that his share of the proceeds from the tour would be donated to charity. Jones later received VIP treatment at the Dallas concert. The following is Michael's speech at the press conference:

A lot of people are having trouble getting tickets. The other day I got a letter from a fan in Texas named Ladonna Jones. She'd been saving her money from odd jobs to buy a ticket, but with the turned tour system, she'd have to buy four tickets and she couldn't afford that. So, we asked our promoter to work out a new way of distributing tickets, a way that no longer requires a money order. There has also been a lot of talk about the promoter holding money for tickets that didn't sell. I've asked our promoter to end the mail order ticket system as soon as possible so that no one will pay money unless they get a ticket. Finally, and most importantly, there's something else I am going to announce today. I want you to know that I decided to donate all my money I make from our performance to charity. There will be further press statements released in the next two weeks.

Afterwards, the procedures were modified, but all sales continued to be made by mail (except for the six final shows at Dodger Stadium, where tickets were also sold through Ticketmaster). Tickets were typically made available only a week to ten days in advance, and many tickets ended up in the hands of ticket brokers.

The ticket price remained unchanged and at a press conference, King justified the $30 price as appropriate and that he did not blame the promoters for charging that price, adding that "you must understand, you get what you pay for."

Financial difficulties

The tour sold what was then a record number of tickets despite the high price. The opening shows were widely covered in the national media and sold out. "Anybody who sees this show will be a better person for years to come", King told the media before the first date in Kansas City. "Michael Jackson has transcended all earthly bounds. Every race, color and creed is waiting for this tour."

Sullivan had estimated in June that he would make up to $13 million, but by August he had reduced that estimate by more than three-quarters, to $3 million. Transporting the 365-ton stage Michael had designed, which took up one-third of a football field (approximately ), required over thirty tractor trailers. It was so large it required using some of the seating area, in some venues taking as much as a quarter of the potential available seats off the market.

Before the tour began Sullivan had spent nearly a million dollars on legal fees and insurance. Among the 250 workers on the tour payroll was an "ambiance director" who provided "homey touches" to the traveling parlor the group relaxed in before and after shows. Overhead costs were soon averaging around a million dollars a week, far over expectations, and Sullivan was unable to pay the $24 million balance on the advance. He renegotiated the deal down to 75% of gross potential seat revenues soon after the tour began.

Jackson family tensions
Tensions between Michael and his brothers increased during the tour. Michael stayed at his own hotels and flew between stops on a private jet while the rest of the family flew commercial. At one point he demanded that a publicist be fired and when he found out right before a show that she had not been, he refused to go on until she was. Michael was also disappointed that his idol James Brown had declined his invitation to join the group on stage at Madison Square Garden in New York City due to Brown's continued outrage about the ticket lottery.

The other Jacksons also had grievances with Michael. He turned down a multimillion-dollar offer from Paramount Pictures to film one of the shows that his brothers had accepted, only to have a crew he had hired show up to shoot its own film several nights later (they subsequently blocked its release). Despite a pretour agreement that only the Jacksons themselves could ride in the van chartered to take them to shows, Michael began taking child star Emmanuel Lewis along with them. Later, after a similar agreement over a helicopter that took the brothers to a show at Giants Stadium in East Rutherford, New Jersey, Michael showed up with Sean Lennon (son of John Lennon and Yoko Ono), and his brothers glared at him for the entire flight.

Before the tour was halfway completed, the brothers were taking separate vehicles to concerts, staying on different floors of their hotels, and refusing to talk to each other on the way to shows. Meetings broke down among factions, with two lawyers frequently representing Michael's interests, another Jermaine's, and one more for Jackie, Tito and Marlon. "It was the worst experience Michael had ever had with his brothers", said a longtime family friend. "Some were jealous, there was denial, the whole gamut of human emotions."

Other problems
Health problems affected the tour. Jackie missed the first half with a leg injury, supposedly sustained during rehearsals. At one point, Michael became so exhausted from the stress of quarreling with his brothers that he was placed under medical care.

By the later shows on the tour, its novelty had worn off and the strains were having an effect. Although the Victory album was certified double platinum by the RIAA for sales of 2 million copies, the shows were failing to sell out. Dates planned for Pittsburgh were cancelled; extra shows in Chicago made up the difference. By early October, the time of the shows in Toronto's Exhibition Stadium, a total of 50,000 tickets had gone unsold, so Sullivan renegotiated again, getting the Jacksons to agree to revenues based on actual sales.

Things got worse as the tour reached its final leg on the West Coast. In late November, the shows at Sun Devil Stadium in Tempe, Arizona, just outside Phoenix, were canceled. Officially the reason was that Jermaine was too sick with the flu to perform, but there was some speculation that slow ticket sales played a role as well. Sullivan was so short of cash he stopped payment on a $1.9 million check to the group after the Vancouver dates. Immediately afterwards, he suffered a minor heart attack, and left the hospital early to renegotiate with the Jacksons again, claiming losses of $5–6 million. By this time the parties were no longer meeting in person. The Jacksons agreed to waive the stopped payment in return for a greater share of revenue from the six final shows at Dodger Stadium. Sullivan's estimated profit was down to half a million dollars.

The Jacksons and King had made money even though Sullivan had not, and near the end of the tour they began making plans for a European leg, as well as an Australian leg. When word reached Michael, he let them know through his representatives that he would not take part. At the rain-soaked tour finale in Los Angeles' Dodger Stadium, after six sold-out shows, Michael announced at the end of the show that this would be the last time they would all perform together, much to his brothers' surprise. As a result, the plans to go to Europe and Australia were ended.

Aftermath
Michael's announcement generated some backlash from his brothers. King stated:

Michael was so upset when he learned of King's remarks that he called his lawyer John Branca and demanded to “sue his ass”. Branca calmed him down and persuaded him to drop the idea.

The Jacksons netted approximately $36 million, which worked out to about $7 million for each brother. Michael, who alone did not need the money, donated his share of the proceeds from the tour, approximately $5 million ($ million in  dollars), to three charities, as he had promised, including the T.J. Martell Foundation for Leukemia and Cancer Research, the United Negro College Fund, and Camp Ronald McDonald for Good Times. He had also received an $18 million advance ($ million in  dollars) from Sullivan for a Michael Jackson designer jeans brand, few of which were ever produced and sold before Sullivan had to stop production.

Estimates of SMC's losses have ranged from $13 million to $22 million ($ million to $ million in modern dollars). Sullivan and his father quietly put the word out around the NFL that the Patriots and their stadium were for sale. The $100 million asking price for the combined package made somewhat more sense when the Patriots unexpectedly qualified for Super Bowl XX after the next season the first time they had ever done so. However, the immediate financial return for this achievement was limited especially since the team played entirety of the 1985-86 postseason on the road. Thus, even after reaching the Super Bowl, the team's revenue was not nearly enough for the Sullivans to service the debt from the Victory Tour.

Compared to their contemporary major professional sports league colleagues, the Sullivans were never particularly wealthy owners. Furthermore Sullivan Stadium, although only a thirteen year old facility in 1984, was one of the smallest venues in the league and already well into the process of becoming outmoded by NFL standards. At one point they were so close to bankruptcy that the NFL had to advance them $4 million to make their payroll. Sullivan's woes increased when his wife filed for divorce, and he had to set up a luxury box at Sullivan Stadium as his personal living quarters. He allegedly wrote several letters to Michael, begging for money to bail the team out, but Michael never replied.

Under heavy pressure from the NFL, the Sullivans finally gave up and sold the Patriots to Victor Kiam in 1988. However, Kiam was unable to keep himself or the team financially stable either, and eventually the Patriots were sold again in 1992 to James Orthwein. Meanwhile, Sullivan Stadium lapsed into bankruptcy and was purchased by Boston paper magnate Robert Kraft. Kraft used the stadium's lease as leverage to prevent Orthwein from breaking the agreement and moving the team to St. Louis. Kraft further made it clear that he would go to court to enforce the lease's ironclad commitment for the Patriots to play in the stadium until 2001. Orthwein then put the team on the market, but the wording of the lease scared off potential buyers because they would also be required to negotiate with Kraft. With no other choice, Orthwein accepted Kraft's own $175 million offer to buy the Patriots in 1994. Kraft has a Victory Tour poster in his office as a reminder of how he was able to realize his lifelong dream of owning the Patriots.

People
Aside from a few months in mid-1975 and Michael's 30th Anniversary Celebration concert in 2001, the Victory Tour was one of the very few times that all six Jackson brothers worked together at the same time as a band. Jackie missed most of the tour because of a leg injury, which was described at the time as a knee injury incurred during strenuous rehearsals. Margaret Maldonado, the mother of two of Jermaine's children, has alleged that Jackie in fact broke his leg in an automobile accident: his first wife Enid intentionally ran him over in a parking lot after catching him with another woman. Jackie would, however, eventually recover and was able to rejoin his brothers on stage for the last portion of the tour.

Michael sang all the lead vocals, except for a trio of Jermaine's solo hits.

Eddie Van Halen made a special guest appearance doing the "Beat It" guitar solo on July 13 in Irving, the night before his band, Van Halen, played three nights at Texas Stadium during the Victory Tour

Shortly after the tour ended and the announcement that it was the group's final tour, Michael returned to his solo career and Marlon left the group to start a solo career of his own.

Set list
 "Sword in the Stone" (Introduction)
"Wanna Be Startin' Somethin'"
"Things I Do for You"
"Off the Wall" 
"Human Nature" 
"This Place Hotel"
"She's Out of My Life"
"Let's Get Serious" / "You Like Me, Don't You?" / "Dynamite" / "Tell Me I'm Not Dreamin' (Too Good to Be True)" (Jermaine and Michael only)
"I Want You Back" / "The Love You Save" / "I'll Be There"
"Rock with You"
"Lovely One"
Encore
"Workin' Day and Night"
"Beat It"
"Billie Jean"
"Shake Your Body (Down to the Ground)" (contain excerpts from  "Don't Stop 'Til You Get Enough")

Tour dates

Known preparation dates 

The first Victory Tour was originally scheduled in Lexington, Kentucky on June 22, 1984. This plan got cancelled and a dress rehearsal was done instead.

Known cancelled shows 

There were also some plans to take the tour to Europe and Australia in 1985, but Michael Jackson refused to take part because of his solo career.

Notes

Personnel

Performers
 Michael Jackson: vocals
 Randy Jackson: vocals, percussion, keyboards
 Jermaine Jackson: vocals; bass
 Tito Jackson: vocals; guitar
 Marlon Jackson: vocals; percussion
 Jackie Jackson: vocals; percussion (First performance during the Quebec concerts.)
 Keyboards: Rory Kaplan, Pat Leonard and Jai Winding
 Guitar: David Williams and Gregg Wright
 Drums: Jonathan Moffett

Credits
 Tour Coordinator and Co-Producer with the Jacksons: Larry Larson
 Assistant Coordinator: Marla Winston
 Production Manager: Peyton Wilson
 Assistant Production Managers: Gary Bouchard and Debbie Lyons
 Stage Manager: Mike Hirsh
 Assistant Stage Manager: Pee Wee Jackson
 Production Consultant: Ken Graham
 Site Coordinators: John "Bugzee" Hougdahl, Jose Ward
 Stage Construction and Engineering: Plainview, Inc. – John McGraw
 Robotic Lighting: Design – Michael Jackson
 Eidophor Video Projection: M.B. Productions, Inc.
 Design execution and manufacturing: Applied Entertainment Systems
 Lighting Company: TASCO
 Sound Company: Clair Brothers Audio
 House Mixers: ML Procise and Mike Stahl
 Monitor engineer: Rick Coberly
 Laser Effects: Showlasers, Inc., Dallas, Texas
 Laser Special Effects Operator: Michael Moorhead
 Laser Technician: Steve Glasow
 Musicians Costumes Design: Enid Jackson
 Magical Illusions: Franz Harary
 Tour Photographer: Harrison Funk
Video Director: Sandy Fullerton
 Jackson Crew Sportswear: Nike
 Community Affairs: Harold Preston
 Consultant to Community Affairs: Cynthia Wilson
 Pyrotechnics Director: John Watkins

See also 
 List of highest-grossing concert tours

References

External links 
 Image of The Jacksons performing on stage in Kansas City's Arrowhead Stadium during the Victory Tour, 1984. Los Angeles Times Photographic Archive (Collection 1429). UCLA Library Special Collections, Charles E. Young Research Library, University of California, Los Angeles.

The Jacksons concert tours
1984 concert tours
Farewell concert tours